Below are the rosters for the national ringette teams which competed in the 2022 World Ringette Championships.

Seniors

Team Canada Senior
The 2022  Senior team included the following:

Team Finland Senior
The 2022  Senior team included the following:

Juniors

Team Canada Junior
The 2022  Junior Under-21 team (U21) was chosen during a selection camp held in Mississauga, Ontario.

For this WRC, athletes were named to Ringette Canada’s, "Junior National Travelling Team Roster". This roster was made up of 20 "Playing Roster" athletes, and 2 "Development Roster" athletes. Development Roster athletes were only added to the Playing Roster if the athlete was deemed unfit to play for medical reasons and thus needed to be removed from the Playing Roster.

Team Finland Junior
The 2022  Junior Under-21 team (U21) included a total of 18 players. In addition, two separate teams, Finland U18, competed against national teams who were in the 2022 President's Pool. One team involved players born in 2004, the other in 2005.

President's Pool

Team Sweden Senior
The 2022  Senior team included the following:

Team USA Senior
The 2022  Senior team included the following:

Team Czech Republic Senior
The 2022  Senior team included the following:

Finland U18
Two separate teams, Finland U18 2004 (players born in 2004) and Finland U18 2005 (players born in 2005) competed against the 2022 teams of Team Sweden Senior and Team USA Senior.

Finland U18 2004

Finland U18 2005

References

External links
WRC 2022 - Ringette Finland

World Ringette Championships
International sports competitions hosted by Finland
2020s in Finland